The basketball competition at the 2014 Central American and Caribbean Games was held in Veracruz, Mexico.

The tournament was scheduled to be held from 19–28 November at the Benito Juarez Auditorium.

Medal summary

Women's tournament

Group A
|}

Group B
|}

Medal table

References

External links
Official Website

basketball 
2014–15 in North American basketball
Basketball at the Central American and Caribbean Games
International basketball competitions hosted by Mexico